Muse Hassan Sheikh Abdulle, also known as Muse Sayyid Hassan, is a senior Somali military figure and politician. He has been the acting president of Somalia and interim speaker of the Federal Parliament. Abdulle is Somalia's ambassador to Italy.

Biography
His name is transliterated in various ways including Musa Hassan Abdulle. Mussa Hassan was born in 1940 in Shilabo, Ogaden. Abdulle hails from Bahgeri sub-clan of the larger Ogaden Absame Kuumade Darod clan.

Career

Military career
Abdulle was a prominent member of the Somali National Army. He was among the first three Somali cadets to graduate from the Military Academy of Modena (Accademia Militare di Modena), located in Modena, northern Italy. In 1985, Abdulle received a fellowship to attend the National Defense University in Washington, D.C. He graduated from the institution the following year.

Federal Government of Somalia

Federal Parliament and interim presidency
Following the end of the mandate of the Transitional Federal Government (TFG) on 20 August 2012 and the concurrent start of the Federal Government of Somalia, Abdulle, as the eldest legislator, was appointed interim speaker of the new Federal Parliament during its inaugural session held at the Aden Adde International Airport in Mogadishu. He was additionally named Acting President at the ceremony, which also saw the swearing in of many MPs. Voting for a new speaker of Parliament was held on 28 August 2012, with former Minister of Transportation and Minister of Labor and Sports Mohamed Osman Jawari elected the permanent speaker. On 30 August 2012, the Federal Parliament convened and unanimously endorsed a new committee tasked with overseeing Somalia's 2012 presidential elections. At the parliamentary session chaired by the new Speaker Jawari, 15 MPs were named to the body and Abdulle was appointed as the commission's chairperson. The ballot was eventually held on 1 September 2012, with Hassan Sheikh Mohamud elected as the new President of Somalia.

Ambassador to Italy
On 20 June 2013, Abdulle was named Somalia's ambassador to Italy by the cabinet.

Military training and positions

Training
 National Defense University, Washington, D.C. – Class of 1986
 Scuola di Guerra (War College), Civitavecchia, Italy – 1968–70
 Battalion Commander Training, Mogadishu, Somalia – 1964–65
 Scuola Applicazione d'Arma (Military Research Institute), Turin, Italy – 1961–63
 Modena Military Academy, Modena, Italy – 1959–61
 Scuola Media Superiore (High School), Mogadishu – 1955–59

Experience
 Commander, 60th Division, Baidoa, Somalia – 1986–89
 Promoted to the rank of brigadier general – 1986
 Commandant, Ahmed Gurey War College, Mogadishu – 1983–84
 Member, National Purchasing Board, Mogadishu – 1979–83
 Defense Attache, Rome, Italy – 1976–79
 Military Advisor & Aide to the President – 1973–76
 Promoted to the rank of colonel – 1974
 Director of Operations, Ministry of Defense – 1971–73
 Commander, 26th Division, Somali National Army, Hargeisa – 1970–71
 Promoted to the rank of lieutenant colonel – 1970
 Commander, Tank and motorized Battalions, Hargeisa – 1965–68
 Promoted to the rank of major – 1967
 Promoted to the rank of captain – 1965
 Promoted to the rank of 1st lieutenant – 1963
 Promoted to the rank of 2nd lieutenant – 1961
 Joined Somali National Army – 1959

References

See also
Muhammad Ali Samatar
Abdirizak Mohamud Abubakar
Abdullahi Yusuf Ahmed
Abdullahi Ahmed Irro
 Mohamed Osman Qadi 

Ethnic Somali people
Living people
Members of the Federal Parliament of Somalia
Presidents of Somalia
Speakers of the Federal Parliament of Somalia
Somalian military leaders
Somalian Muslims
Somalian generals
Ambassadors of Somalia to Italy
Somalian diplomats
1940 births